Bukowina Sycowska  is a village in the administrative district of Gmina Międzybórz, within Oleśnica County, Lower Silesian Voivodeship, in south-western Poland.

References

Bukowina Sycowska